The firm of W. Head & Sister, also known as Head & Sister, was a photographic studio in Dows, Iowa, United States, circa .

The forename of W. Head and his sister are unknown.

Two extant cabinet photographs from the studio exist in the Peter Palmquist Collection of Women in Photography at the Beinecke Rare Book and Manuscript Library at Yale University, New Haven, Connecticut.

References

Photographic studios
American portrait photographers
Artists from Iowa
People from Wright County, Iowa
People from Franklin County, Iowa
19th-century American photographers
Photography companies of the United States
19th-century American women photographers
19th-century American women